The Ministry of Urban Development ("Ministria e Zhvillimit Urban " or "MZHU") was a department of the Albanian Government responsible for urban planning, development, housing and legalization of informal settlements. The last serving minister was Eglantina Gjermeni of the Socialist Party.

Subordinate institutions
 Agency for Legalization, Urbanization and Integration of Informal Construction Areas
 National Agency of Territorial Planning
 Technical Construction Archive
 National Housing Authority

Officeholders (2013–2017)

References

Urban Development
Albania